Pakistan Customs is one of the elite cadres of the Civil Services of Pakistan. It is staffed by officers from the Pakistan Customs Service (PCS) which is one of the premier occupational groups among Pakistan's civil services.

Previously known as the Customs & Excise Group, it was re-classified as Pakistan Customs Service in November 2010, when the responsibilities of sales tax and federal excise were taken away and a new occupational service was created to collect Sales Tax, Federal Excise, and Income Tax, named as Inland Revenue Service (IRS).

It has given the PCS officers a break to focus on their core function of guarding the nation's borders against smuggling, illegitimate trade, and money laundering. The role of Pakistan Customs Service has been enhanced as a law enforcement agency with focus on border control.

Powers 
The anti-smuggling powers delegated previously by Pakistan Customs to Pakistan Rangers, Frontier Constabulary, Levies, and Police were withdrawn in view of expansion of Pakistan Customs role in border regions. The shift in the role of Pakistan Customs to a Border Control Agency with substantial responsibility in safeguarding country's trade policies, intellectual property rights, transit trade, money laundering, and smuggling.

Apart from land and air jurisdiction, Pakistan Customs has  sea jurisdiction also, called as Pakistan Customs Waters, where it carries out anti-smuggling operations independently and sometimes jointly with Pakistan Coast Guards and Pakistan Maritime Security Agency.

History
The origin of an organized Customs Department in the sub-continent can be traced to 1878 when maritime Customs operations were sought to be institutionalized by Her Majesty's Crown under the Sea Customs Act.

In 1901, Karachi was declared as the chief port of Sindh. In the following year, a plan was instituted to build permanent offices for the port and Customs officials at Karachi. The task was entrusted to G. Willet, the consulting architect to the Government of Bombay, who designed the new building as a semi-circular structure in the Victorian tradition. The construction of the building commenced in 1912 and culminated in 1914. The first meeting of Karachi Port Trust and Customs was held in that building on 12 January 1916.

The Custom House Karachi is the headquarters of Preventive Collectorate, Appraisement Collectorate, and Exports Collectorate, in addition to Model Customs Collectorate at present. In the southern region also, the Collectorate of Customs, Central Excise and Sales Tax, Hyderabad was established in 1967 subsequent to the bifurcation of the Collectorate of Central Excise, Karachi. The jurisdiction of Hyderabad Customs Collectorate comprises the whole of Sindh, excluding Karachi, Multan, and Bahawalpur.

In the northern part of the country, Customs and Central Excise operations were carried out simultaneously through the Collectorate of Central Excise and Land Customs Lahore. It was the second oldest Collectorate in the country whose jurisdiction spanned the whole of the former West Pakistan, barring Karachi and Balochistan. Custom House Lahore was the regional Customs and Central Excise headquarters.

See also
 Pakistan Customs cricket team

References

External links
 Official website 

 
Pakistan federal departments and agencies
Customs services